This article lists the Canadian number-one albums of 1977. The chart was compiled and published by RPM every Saturday.

Peter Frampton's I'm in You entered the chart at #1. Two acts held the top position in the albums and singles charts simultaneously: Barbra Streisand on March 19 – 26 and Fleetwood Mac on September 10.

(Entries with dates marked thus* are not presently on record at Library and Archives Canada and were inferred from the following week's listing. The first page of the chart displayed for July 30 is erroneously the Country Albums chart; the entry for this date was inferred from the following week's issue. The entries for January 15 and 26 appear with the incorrect date January 15, 1976 at the top of the page; the column showing number of weeks for listings reveals them however to be accurate.)

References

See also
1977 in music
RPM number-one hits of 1977

1977
1977 in Canadian music